The 1979 McNeese State Cowboys football team represented McNeese State University as a member of the Southland Conference during the 1979 NCAA Division I-A football season. Led by first-year head coach Ernie Duplechin, the Cowboys compiled an overall record of 11–1 with a mark of 5–0 in conference play, winning the Southland title. McNeese State was invited to the Independence Bowl, where they lost to Syracuse.

Schedule

References

McNeese State
McNeese Cowboys football seasons
Southland Conference football champion seasons
McNeese State Cowboys football